Roger Rossat-Mignod (born 23 September 1946) is a retired French alpine skier who competed in the 1972 Winter Olympics.

External links
 sports-reference.com

1946 births
Living people
French male alpine skiers
Olympic alpine skiers of France
Alpine skiers at the 1972 Winter Olympics
Place of birth missing (living people)
20th-century French people